The Big Beat is an album by Art Blakey and his group The Jazz Messengers recorded on March 6, 1960 and released on the Blue Note label. It features performances by Blakey with Lee Morgan, Wayne Shorter, Bobby Timmons, and Jymie Merritt.

Track listing 
 "The Chess Players" (Shorter) - 9:31
 "Sakeena's Vision" (Shorter) - 6:04
 "Politely" (Hardman) - 6:04
 "Dat Dere" (Timmons) - 8:47
 "Lester Left Town" (Shorter) - 6:26
 "It's Only a Paper Moon" (Arlen, Harburg, Rose) - 6:38
 "It's Only a Paper Moon" [Alternate Take] - 6:19 Bonus track on CD

Personnel 
 Art Blakey — drums
 Lee Morgan — trumpet, flugelhorn
 Wayne Shorter — tenor saxophone
 Bobby Timmons — piano
 Jymie Merritt — bass

References 

Art Blakey albums
The Jazz Messengers albums
1960 albums
Albums produced by Alfred Lion
Blue Note Records albums
Albums recorded at Van Gelder Studio